Neil Hudson may refer to:

 Neil Hudson (motorcyclist) (born 1957), English former professional motocross racer 
 Neil Hudson (politician),  British Conservative Party MP for Penrith and The Border since 2019